Thorsten Wiedemann (born 4 October 1985) is a German international rugby union player, playing for the Heidelberger RK in the Rugby-Bundesliga and the German national rugby union team.

Biography
Wiedemann grew up in Heidelberg, playing rugby for the Heidelberger RK. He joined TSV Handschuhsheim for two seasons, alongside his coach, in August 2007. He spend some time in New Zealand in 2007 playing for the Hamilton Marist RFC.

He made his debut for Germany on 29 September 2007 in a friendly against Switzerland. He made his last game for Germany to date against Portugal on 21 February 2009. He was also part of the squad for the Russia game on 2 May 2009 but was not substituted in.

In the 2008–09 season, while playing for the TSV Handschuhsheim, he was the top-scorer in the Bundesliga with 212 points. He joined the Heidelberger RK for the 2009–10 season but emigrated to Australia during the winter break. He now plays for the Sunshine Coast Stingrays in Queensland Premier Rugby.

After two years in Australia Wiedemann rejoined Heidelberger RK for the 2012-13 Bundesliga season.

Honours

Club
 German rugby union cup
 Winners: 2008
 Runners-up: 2009

Personal
 Rugby-Bundesliga
 Top scorer: 2008-09

Stats
Thorsten Wiedemann's personal statistics in club and international rugby:

Club

 As of 25 June 2012

National team

European Nations Cup

Friendlies & other competitions

 As of 18 March 2010

References

External links
 Thorsten Wiedemann at scrum.com
   Thorsten Wiedemann at totalrugby.de

1985 births
Living people
German rugby union players
Germany international rugby union players
TSV Handschuhsheim players
Heidelberger RK players
Rugby union fly-halves
Sportspeople from Heidelberg